Yuan Quan (born 16 October 1977), also known as Yolanda Yuan, is a Chinese actress and singer. She graduated from the Central Academy of Drama where she majored in drama.

Career
Yuan starred in her first film Rhapsody of Spring (1998), which won her the Golden Rooster Award for Best Supporting Actress. Her subsequent films also earned her awards; Once Upon a Time in Shanghai (1998) earned her a nomination for Best Actress at the Golden Rooster Award and A Love of Blueness (2000) brought her the Best Actress trophy at the Beijing College Student Film Festival. In 2002, Yuan won her second Golden Rooster Award for her performance in Pretty Big Feet by Mo Yan, the first film that depicts contemporary western China.

Though Yuan achieved success in films, it is on stage that Yuan has earned most fame and applause. She chose to become a professional drama actress at the National Theater of China after graduation and first attracted the audience and media in the 2001 production of Hurricane. Yuan rose to prominence in 2005 when she starred in Meng Jinghui's musical drama Amber, which was a hit; touring seven cities in Asia and attracting more than 100,000 audiences. In 2006, she starred in Secret Love in Peach Blossom Land by Stan Lai, which won critical acclaim and was voted  "Best Stage Drama of 2006". The success of the play led to Yuan's introduction to famous Taiwan musician Yao Qian, who in turn inspired Yuan Quan to start a musical career. In 2007, Yuan released her first album, The Lonely Flower.

Yuan also took on the role of the titular protagonist for the 2009 and 2013 drama production Jane Eyre by the National Center for the Performing Arts. Her performance received acclaim; in an audience poll conducted by the Beijing News, 90% believed that Yuan's Jane did justice to the novel, conveying the character's ‘calm, introverted and persistent personality’. Yuan won the China Golden Lion Award for Drama in 2010 and the Plum Blossom Award in 2012; both are considered high honors in theater.

2014 was a successful year for Yuan, who starred in two top-grossing films Breakup Buddies and The Continent.

In 2017, Yuan co-starred in The First Half of My Life, a drama that tells the inspirational story of a housewife-turned-career woman. The drama was a huge hit in China.

Personal life
Yuan Quan was born in a Hui-Han family. She married actor Xia Yu in 2009, a decade after their first got together as students in Central Academy of Drama. They have appeared in 4 films together: The Law of Romance (2003), Waiting Alone (2004), Shanghai Rumba (2006) and Breakup Buddies (2014). Yuan Quan also portrayed a character named Xia Yu in Pretty Big Feet (2002). Their daughter was born on 31 March 2010.

Filmography

Film

Television series

Theater

Discography

Albums

Awards and nominations

Television, Film and Theater

Music

References

External links
 
 

1977 births
Living people
Actresses from Hubei
Central Academy of Drama alumni
People from Jingzhou
Singers from Hubei
Chinese stage actresses
20th-century Chinese actresses
21st-century Chinese actresses
Chinese film actresses
Chinese television actresses
21st-century Chinese women singers
Chinese women television presenters
Chinese television presenters
Chinese broadcasters
VJs (media personalities)
Middle School Affiliated to the National Academy of Chinese Theatre Arts alumni